La Cacica (stylized onscreen La Cacica, un corazón de leyenda), is a Colombia telenovela that premiered on Venezuelan broadcast television channel Televen on September 4, 2017, and concluded on October 30, 2017. The telenovela is based on the life on the Colombian writer and politics Consuelo Araújo Noguera. It stars Viña Machado as the titular character.

Plot 
This is the story of Consuelo Araújo Noguera (Viña Machado), a woman who arrives as a hurricane to revolutionize the serene winds of Valledupar. She takes care that popular music enters unthinkable places, sounds loudly in the Caribbean, extends throughout the entire country and crosses continents. Unfortunately, her life comes to an end after being kidnapped and murdered in the jungle by her captors.

Cast 
 Viña Machado as Consuelo Araújo Noguera
 George Coba as Gabriel García Márquez
 Simón Araújo as Young Álvaro Araújo Noguera
 Ismael Barrios as Hernando Molina
 Valeria Henríquez as Young Consuelo Araújo Noguera
 Lucas Buelvas as Naldo Molina
 Iroky Peréz as Pablo López
 Rita Bendeck as Bella Araujo
 Tania Fálquez as Candelaria
 Sebastián Carvajal as Edgardo José Maya Villazón
 Kevin Bury as Young Nando Molina
 Carolina Cuervo as Elena Parodi
 María Laura Quintero as María Lourdes
 Che Carrillo as Rafael Escalona
 Andrés Felipe Martínez as Alfonso López Michelsen
 Eileen Roca as La Chechi
 Laura Barjum as Young La Chechi
 Álvaro Araújo Castro as Álvaro Araújo Noguera
 Diego León García as Young Martín
 Felipe Galofre as Martín
 Sofía Araújo Mejía as Meche Molina
 Rebeca Milanés as La Maye
 Carlos Andrés Villa as Nicolás «Colacho» Mendoz
 Aco Pérez as Jaime Molina
 Simon Araujo as Alvaro Araujo
 Josse Narváez as Félix Socarras
 Raúl Ocampo as Beto Araújo
 Xilena Aicardy as Estrella Socarrás
 Carolina Celedón as Rita Fernández
 Adolfo Sanjuanello as Jesús Araújo
 Éibar Gutiérrez as Alejandro Durán
 Cristina García as Maria Lourdes Socarras
 Eliana Raventos as Chavela Araujo

References

External links 
 

Colombian telenovelas
Spanish-language telenovelas
Caracol Televisión telenovelas
2017 Colombian television series debuts
2017 Colombian television series endings
2017 telenovelas
Television shows set in Cartagena, Colombia